Moody Park is a light rail station on METRORail's Red Line in Houston, Texas, United States. It opened as part of the Red Line extension on December 21, 2013. It services Moody Park.

Bus connections
78-Alabama/Irvington

METRORail stations
Railway stations in the United States opened in 2013
Railway stations in Harris County, Texas